Eleanor Moody-Shepherd is the Dean of Students at New York Theological Seminary and a Professor of Women Studies at New York at the Seminary.  Eleanor is a researcher and teacher in areas of domestic violence, women leadership and women in the bible. She is an organizer for international travel study seminars to the Holy Land, Africa, and other parts of the world. She co-organizes trips to the southern part of the United States of America  for the study of history, the Civil Rights Movement, and southern religious teaches. Moody-Shepherd is an educational consultant, preacher, and motivational speaker. 
She is an author, and a co-author of “Bringing the City to Light: Pastoral Formation in a Multicultural Urban Context,” with Martha Jacobs and Rebeca Radillo. It is published in the book Equipping the Saints: Best Practices in Contextual Education.

The New York Theological Seminary has a resource center for women named after Dr. Eleanor Moody Shepherd.  
She is an ordained Minister with the Presbyterian Church, USA.

Early life
She grew up in Alabama where she learned survival and resourceful skills living in struggle.  She participated in the Civil Rights Movement in the 1950s and 1960s.

Education
Tuskegee University
Alabama State University
State University of New York
BA Vassar College
MS Long Island University
MDiv New York Theological Seminary
EdD Teachers College, Columbia University

Career
Eleanor Moody-Shepherd is the Dean of Students for the New York Theological Seminary which was founded in 1900. It was known as the Biblical Seminary. In 1966 it became the New York Theological Seminary. She is also a Professor of Women Studies at the Seminary. The New York Theological Seminary is known for having a diverse student body and urban ministry.

The New York Theological Seminary Women's Center was renamed Eleanor Moody-Shepherd Women's Resource Center to honor Dr. Shepherd. and the launching of the Birthing Center Think Tank for Women. A free one Day forum was held entitled 'Thinking Outside of the Womb that included the voices of students, family friends, faculty, churches and partnering institutions as they birthed the women's Birthing Think Center Think Tank for Women, so-as to empower women in strengthening relationships between women, men, and children in their communities. The Resource Center for Women was founded in 1986.

The Eleanor Moody-Shepherd Resource Center for Women in Ministry was founded in 1986. It provides fellowship events, learning experiences and programs. It is an organizing forum for women of diverse ethnic backgrounds.

Moody-Shepherd has written a chapter in the book; New Feminist Christianity: Many Voices, Many Views By Mary E. Hunt, Diann L. Neu, called Our Voices Loud and Clear.

She is a co-author of Evangelical Coalitions for Justice Evangelicals and Empire: Christian Alternatives to the Political Status Quo with Bruce Ellis Benson, Peter Goodwin Heltzel.

The Red Tent Project was launched by the Eleanor Moody-Shepherd Resource Center for Women in Ministry.

References

External links
Rev Dr Eleanor Moody Shepherd Lecture
Women's TV - Dr Moody Shepherd
Teaching Bible in the City Roundtable
Moody shephard 5 years ago
Dr. Eleanor Moody-Shepherd discusses the collaboration with New York Theological Seminary and New York Theological Education Center

Year of birth missing (living people)
Living people
New York Theological Seminary alumni
Vassar College alumni
Long Island University alumni
Teachers College, Columbia University alumni
Women civil rights activists
American women writers
African-American women academics
American women academics
African-American academics
Education activists
American anti-racism activists
Activists for African-American civil rights
American women's rights activists
Female biblical scholars
Christian feminist biblical scholars
21st-century African-American people
21st-century African-American women
African-American women writers